Matapédia (former name: Saint-Laurent-de-Matapédia) is a municipality at the southern tip of the Gaspé Peninsula, in eastern Quebec, Canada.  Matapédia is located along Quebec Route 132 on the border of New Brunswick.

In addition to Matapédia itself, the municipality also includes the hamlets of Mann Settlement,  Runnymede, and Matapédia West.

Toponymy
Its name may derive from the Mi'kmaq word matapegiag, meaning "river junction", from the parts mata (junction) and pegiag (river), referring to the Matapédia River that crosses the town just before its confluence with the Restigouche River.  Another source from the late nineteenth century indicates that the Mi'kmaq named the area Magabegeak which means "roughly flowing".  It has also been spelled many different ways over time such as Matapediach, Madapeguia, Matapeguia, Matapediac, Matakpediack, Madapeguia, Metapedia, or Matapediac.

Residents and village expatriates are known as Matapedians.

Geography 

Matapédia is located south of the Saint Lawrence River on the south side of the Gaspé Peninsula at the eastern end of the Matapédia Valley at the mouth of the Matapédia River in junction with the Restigouche River. It is located 500 km northeast of Quebec City and 350 km southwest of the city of Gaspé. The major cities near Matapedia are Campbellton, New Brunswick 25 km to the east and Amqui 80 km to the northwest.

The municipality of Matapédia is part of the regional county municipality of Avignon in the administrative region of Gaspésie–Îles-de-la-Madeleine. It includes three hamlets:
 Mann Settlement
 Matapédia West
 Runnymede

History

Colonization 
In 1808, colonization began with the arrival of Loyalists, followed by Irish settlers in 1850, Acadians in 1860, and French Canadians in 1865.  The feat of colonization was no simple act, the entire valley had undergone immense forest fires at the middle of the 19th century, with building woods scarce.  According to a commissioned report, a thousand square miles of forest had burned in the 1864 blaze, and even worst, the river had flooded in 1865.

In 1842, the geographic township was formed, named after the Matapédia River. In 1860, a mission is established, and in 1864, the Matapédia Post Office opened. On November 4, 1905, the place was incorporated as the Parish Municipality of Saint-Laurent-de-Matapédia, named after the local parish and township. But since 1973, it has been officially known by its abbreviated name Matapédia.

Present day
The village has one general store and a designated Heritage Railway Station since 1994.  The economy is mainly focused on the local geography, with activities such as salmon fishing, fly tying, hunting and tourism. For many years the town contained a baseball field, however in recent times it has been transformed into a soccer field.  Matapédia contains a CLSC,  although the closest hospital is on the New Brunswick side: the Restigouche Hospital Centre on Salmon Boulevard.  The town also contains a belvedere facing the main part of town over 200 metres up.  Fishing remains an important part of the Matapédia economy and heritage, conservation efforts have been made to help the Atlantic salmon in both rivers, such as protection of breeding grounds.    On February 27, 2010, the status of the parish municipality was changed to just municipality.  A ski hill exists in the village, known as Petit Chamonix since the mid-twentieth century.  The Provigo warehouse has been abandoned for the past 15 years, on the side of the 132 Highway.

Flooding

Recurring floods 
The junction of the Matapédia River and Restigouche River floods into the village during the thaw of the ice during the onset of spring.  Notable floods (natural disasters) have occurred in:
 1861 - autumn - damage to the highway and minor damage to a bridge, the Commissioner of Public Works was warned that a breakwater could be built to help stop persistent flooding.
 1896-1897 - spring - very devastating flooding.
 1959 - April 23 - a large ice jam developed under the Matapédia bridge, Transports Québec attempted to unblock the jam with dynamite however never revealed the outcome of the attempt.
 1974 - January 19 - a flood develops at Routhierville, Quebec which causes 3 miles of the highway to flood and the town to flood.
 1974 - April 29 to May 18 - massive flooding caused evacuations as well as flooding of the Motel Restigouche, the CCGS Tupper was eventually called in to help.
 1992 - April 23 - a fast flood developed which caused evacuations in Runnymede while for a half day the Motel Restigouche and corresponding street "Rue des Saumons" were inundated, the flood was comparative to the 1974 flood but shorter in time.
 1994 - April 16 and 17 - 4 bridges destroyed or heavily damaged, Main Street inundated, all highway links to the town flooded, 100 citizens evacuated.
 2008 - April 21 - Restigouche River overflows and causes minor damages and evacuations.

Cause of floods 
Since 1962, the Environment Canada hydrologic station located on the upper portion of the Restigouche River has reported substantial increases of water flow, sometimes at over 400% above previous levels.  Clear cutting of forest on both the Matapédia River and Restigouche River has created areas with no shade along the banks of the river, resulting in a faster melt than in previous years.  Furthermore, the clear cut land lacks the naturally occurring moss which would help colloidal suspension in soil and retention.  This creates the ideal condition for Spring thawing.  Another factor in the flooding is the construction of bridges in the rivers, with the dykes acting as dams, further blocking passage of the flow.  This information was sent to the United Nations Commission on Human Rights in a complaint by former owner of the Motel, Peter Dubé.

Administration 
The Matapédia municipal council consists of a mayor and six councilors elected in rotating block every four years without territorial division.

Furthermore, Carole Bélanger is the Director-general, secretary treasurer and coordinator for emergency measures for the municipality.

Tourism 

The Matapédia River is internationally recognized for its many pools for fishing for Atlantic salmon.  To safeguard these pools for future generations, the wildlife reserve Rivières-Matapédia-et-Patapédia was established on a part of its course to protect this resource.  The Matapédia flat is located near the mouth of the Restigouche just north of the bridge.

Famous Matapedians 
 Jean-Eudes Dubé, lawyer and politician, born in 1926 in Matapédia;
 Maurice Harquail, politician, born in 1938 in Matapédia.

Political representation 

Provincially it is part of the riding of Bonaventure . In the 2022 Quebec general election MNA Catherine Blouin, of the Coalition Avenir Québec, was elected to represent the population of Matapédia in the National Assembly of Quebec.

Federally, Matapédia is part of the federal riding of Gaspésie—Les Îles-de-la-Madeleine. In the 2021 Canadian federal election, the incumbent Diane Lebouthillier of the Liberal Party was re-elected to represent the population Matapédia in the House of Commons of Canada.

Population 

Population change in Matapédia

According to Statistics Canada, the population of Matapédia, Quebec was 566 inhabitants in 2021. The demographic trend in recent years follows the overall pattern of Gaspé Peninsula and Bas-Saint-Laurent, that is to say a steady decrease. This corresponds to a decrease of 12.2% in five years. The median age of Matapédia residents is higher than in most of Quebec at 54.4 years.

The total number of dwellings in the municipality is 357, however only 307 of these units are occupied by permanent residents. The majority of homes are Matapedia villas and apartment buildings.

According to Statistics Canada immigration is basically non-existent in Matapédia. 80% of the population has French listed as mother tongue and 20% are English-speaking Quebecers. However, 43% of the population masters the two official languages of Canada.  For single language speakers, 46% speak only French and 11% speak only English. Two percent of Matapédians identify as aboriginal.

The unemployment rate in the municipality was 20% in 2016. The median income of Matapédiens was $27,648 in 2015.

According to Statistics Canada, 30% of the population 15 years and over Matapédia has no high school diploma education. 20% of the population has only a high school diploma or vocational. All Matapedia graduates completed their studies in Canada.

Demographics

Statistics

Language
Mother tongue:
 English as mother tongue: 19.3%
 French as mother tongue: 77.1%
 English and French as mother tongue: 3.7%
 Other as mother tongue: 0.9%

See also
 List of municipalities in Quebec
 Avignon—La Mitis—Matane—Matapédia
 Matapedia River
 Matapedia Valley
 Restigouche River
 Haute-Gaspésie—La Mitis—Matane—Matapédia

References

Municipalities in Quebec
Incorporated places in Gaspésie–Îles-de-la-Madeleine